Jorge Javier Moreira Pereira (born 10 March 1998) is a professional footballer who plays for Sanjoanense as a midfielder. Born in Venezuela, Pereira represents Portugal internationally.

Football career
On 21 December 2017, Pereira made his professional debut with Famalicão in a 2017–18 LigaPro match against FC Porto B.

References

External links

1998 births
Living people
Footballers from Caracas
Citizens of Portugal through descent
Portuguese footballers
Portugal youth international footballers
Portuguese people of Venezuelan descent
Association football midfielders
Primeira Liga players
Liga Portugal 2 players
F.C. Famalicão players
AD Oliveirense players
A.D. Sanjoanense players